Matt Gresham (born 30 July 1981) better known by his stage name Logistics, is an English drum and bass music producer and DJ from Cambridge, England. He is signed to Hospital Records and has released eight albums.

Biography
Gresham grew up listening mainly to guitar based music such as Rage Against the Machine, and downtempo electronic music. He took no interest in drum and bass, unlike his brother at the time, until he was introduced to the "Music Box" LP released by Full Cycle Records, which appealed to him as he described it "like downtempo tunes with double time beats".

He creates his music using the Ableton sequencer. His music style tends to be towards the more soul-influenced styles of drum and bass but is also targeted at a club audience rather than a home audience, which is described as such by Hospital Records as "bridging the gap between a lacklustre subgenre, liquid funk, and more exciting, dancefloor orientated drum and bass". His two brothers—Dan Gresham (known as Nu:Tone) and Nick Gresham (known as Other Echoes and, formerly, Bastille)—are also producers signed to Hospital Records. Matt has also collaborated with Dan under the name Nu:Logic.

The first release Gresham was involved in was a collaborative work as Nu:Logic, on Tangent Recordings in 2003. He then went on to release his first work under the name Logistics, "Come To You / Music", on Nu:Tone's own label, Brand.nu, which led to his signing to Hospital Records. At the time, Gresham was taking a degree in graphic design at Goldsmiths College, but he left to pursue a professional career in music production, after achieving success in the drum and bass scene. After leaving college, he released tracks such as "Together" and "Spacejam" (from the Spacejam EP) and "The Trip" (from Weapons of Mass Creation 2) which attracted the attention of Grooverider and Andy C.

His 2006 album "Now More Than Ever", won BBC 1Xtra's 2007 Xtra Bass award. London Elektricity's Tony Colman, the label manager of Hospital Records, described the album in an interview as (at the time) "the most eagerly anticipated debut album ever to be released on Hospital."

He released his eighth studio album, Electric Sun, on 25 March 2016.

On 30 March 2018, the album Hologram was released; the single "Lotus Flower" off this album was released in late 2017.

Discography

Studio albums

Singles and EPs
	

Remixes

References

English DJs
English drum and bass musicians
English record producers
Hospital Records artists
People from Cambridge
Living people
1981 births